Shout! is the debut studio album by the Isley Brothers, released on RCA Victor in 1959.  It was produced by Hugo Peretti and Luigi Creatore.

History
After the success of the title track, the group were rushed into a recording studio to record much of the album, which included another Isley standard, the uncharted "Respectable", which, like "Shout", was also covered by rock acts. The album was re-released in 1990 on the Collectables label after the album went out of print in the years since its release. The album was remastered and expanded for inclusion in the 2015 CD box set The RCA Victor & T-Neck Album Masters, 1959-1983.

Track listing

Personnel
The Isley Brothers
Ronald Isley – lead vocals
O'Kelly Isley, Jr. and Rudolph Isley – background vocals
Technical
Ray Hall – recording engineer

References

External links
 The Isley Brothers - Shout! (1959) album releases & credits at Discogs

1959 debut albums
The Isley Brothers albums
Albums produced by Hugo & Luigi
RCA Records albums